Corynopoma riisei, also known as the sword-tail characin is a species of characin found in Colombia, Trinidad and Tobago and Venezuela. It is also kept as an aquarium fish. This species is the only member of its genus.

Mating system 

Corynopoma riisei have pronounced sexual dimorphism, the females being more aggressive and dominant than males. Males have a grey-black, flag-like ornament that extends from the operculum on each side of the body. This flag is normally held close to the body, but when trying to mate a male will extend the ornament and wave it in front of a female. During courtship the flag is displayed by the males one at a time and at a right angle from its body, they will perform both ornament displays and zigzags. Courtship may extend over several days in swordtail characin.

The flag-like ornament is used as a food mimic to attract females. The females will try to bite at the ornament, which is then often damaged during courtship and can possibly take up to weeks to regenerate. Studies have shown that unfed females will respond more to the male ornament and show a preference for the larger flags than those that had been fed.

This is an example of sensory exploitation because the males are exploiting the females' pre-existing bias to seem more attractive and have more opportunities to mate. Males lack external gonopodia so in order for internal fertilization to occur in the female, they need to be within close proximity for the sperm to transfer successfully. The males use this food mimic to get them within close proximity of females, and will show different ornament displays based on the attractiveness of their ornaments. Males that do not show an overall large ornament size or symmetry can compensate by displaying or zigzagging their flags more often. The males may also be using the hooks on the anal fin to direct the sperm for transfer.

Females store viable sperm internally for up to ten months and will mate with multiple different males in their lifetime. These females would be receiving indirect benefits for the offspring as they are not directly choosing which males they want to be inseminated by but are selecting a food-mimic which can be related to male attractiveness. This attractive quality could then be passed on to offspring.

This species could also be used as an example of sensory drive, males are shown to have morphological differences based on their location and prey available, the females prefer the males whose flag ornament best resembles prey items of the population they live in. It has been demonstrated that the flag resembles an ant, because that is the most common natural prey of the swordtail characin. This plasticity in mate choice can also been shown in a laboratory setting when food colour was altered the females also changed the preference for males to have a flag that matches the colour of food.

Recently it has been hypothesized that the males caudal pheromone gland is used to release pheromones that decrease stress in females and increase activity. This could potentially aid the males in gaining access to females and facilitating the sperm transfer.

References

Characidae
Monotypic fish genera
Fish of South America
Freshwater fish of Colombia
Fish described in 1858